Alaska is the third studio album by American metal band Between the Buried and Me. It was released on September 6, 2005 through Victory Records and is the first album to feature the band's current lineup, with the addition of Dustie Waring on guitar, Dan Briggs on bass, and Blake Richardson on drums. The band co-produced the album with Matthew Ellard, who produced the band's last album The Silent Circus, and Jamie King, who had previously produced the band's self-titled album. The album was remixed and remastered in 2020.

While Alaska did not sell as well as its predecessor The Silent Circus upon release, it still achieved high critical reviews and it includes some of the band's most notable songs, such as its title track and "Selkies: The Endless Obsession". Another version of Alaska was released featuring instrumental versions of most of the songs (excluding tracks 3, 6, and 7). A music video was released for the song "Alaska".

Track listing

Personnel

Between the Buried and Me
Tommy Giles Rogers – lead vocals, keyboards, piano
Paul Waggoner – lead guitar, vocals
Dan Briggs – bass, programming, backing vocals
Dustie Waring – rhythm guitar
Blake Richardson – drums, percussion

Production
Produced by Matthew Ellard and Jamie King
Engineered by Jamie King
Mixed by Matthew Ellard
Kris Smith – mix assistant
Alan Douches – mastering
Wes Richardson – artwork and layout

References

Between the Buried and Me albums
2005 albums
Victory Records albums
Albums produced by Jamie King (record producer)